Roxanne Dunbar-Ortiz (born September 10, 1938) is an American historian, writer, and activist, known for her 2014 book An Indigenous Peoples' History of the United States.

Early life and education 
Born in San Antonio, Texas, in 1938 to an Oklahoma family, Roxanne Dunbar-Ortiz grew up in Central Oklahoma, the daughter of a sharecropper of Scots-Irish ancestry and a mother that Dunbar believes to have been partially Native American, although her mother never claimed to be Native and Dunbar-Ortiz grew up without any Native heritage. Dunbar-Ortiz initially claimed to be Cheyenne but she subsequently acknowledged being white. She now claims that she is Cherokee, and that her mother denied her Native roots because she married Dunbar's father, a white tenant farmer. Dunbar's paternal grandfather was a settler, landed farmer, veterinarian, labor activist and a Socialist Party member in Oklahoma and also a member of the Industrial Workers of the World, "Wobblies". Her father was named after the leaders of the Industrial Workers of the World—Moyer Haywood Pettibone Scarberry Dunbar. Her father's stories of her grandfather inspired her to lifelong social justice activism.

Married at 18, she and her husband moved to San Francisco three years later, where she has lived most of the years since, although the marriage ended. Her account of life up to leaving Oklahoma is recorded in Red Dirt: Growing Up Okie. She has a daughter, Michelle. She later married writer Simon J. Ortiz.

Dunbar-Ortiz graduated from San Francisco State College in 1963, majoring in history. She began graduate study in the Department of History at the University of California, Berkeley but transferred to the University of California, Los Angeles completing her doctorate in history in 1974. In addition to the doctorate, she completed the Diplôme of the International Law of Human Rights at the International Institute of Human Rights, Strasbourg, France in 1983 and an MFA in creative writing at Mills College in 1993.

Activism 
From 1967 to 1974, she was a full-time activist living in various parts of the United States, traveling to Europe, Mexico, and Cuba. She was also involved in the women's liberation movement. Outlaw Woman: Memoir of the War Years outlines this time of her life, chronicling the years 1960–1975.

In 1968 she founded Cell 16, which was a feminist organization in the United States known for its program of celibacy, separation from men and self-defense training (specifically karate); it has been cited as the first organization to advance the concept of separatist feminism.

She contributed the piece "Female liberation as the basis for social revolution" to the 1970 anthology Sisterhood is Powerful: An Anthology of Writings From The Women's Liberation Movement, edited by Robin Morgan.

In 1974, she accepted a position as assistant professor in the newly established Native American Studies program at California State University at Hayward, where she helped develop the departments of Ethnic Studies and Women's Studies. In the wake of the Wounded Knee Siege of 1973, she became active in the American Indian Movement (AIM) and the International Indian Treaty Council, beginning a lifelong commitment to Indigenous peoples' right to self-determination and to international human rights.

She edited the book The Great Sioux Nation, which was published in 1977 and presented as the fundamental document at the first international conference on Indians of the Americas, held at United Nations' headquarters in Geneva, Switzerland. The book was issued in a new edition by University of Nebraska Press in 2013. It was followed by two other books: Roots of Resistance: A History of Land Tenure in New Mexico (1980) and Indians of the Americas: Human Rights and Self-Determination (1984). She also edited two anthologies on Native American economic development, while heading the Institute for Native American Development at the University of New Mexico.

In 1981, Dunbar-Ortiz was asked to visit Sandinista Nicaragua to appraise the land tenure situation of the Miskito Indians in the northeastern region of the country. Her two trips there that year coincided with the beginning of United States government's sponsorship of a proxy war to overthrow the Sandinistas, with the northeastern region on the border with Honduras becoming a war zone and the basis for extensive propaganda carried out by the Reagan administration against the Sandinistas. In over a hundred trips to Nicaragua and Honduras from 1981 to 1989, she monitored what was called the Contra War. She tells of these years in Caught in the Crossfire: The Miskitu Indians of Nicaragua (1985) and Blood on the Border: A Memoir of the Contra War (2005).

In her work An Indigenous Peoples' History of the United States, Dunbar-Ortiz condemns the Discovery Doctrine and the settler colonialism that devastated Native American populations in the United States. She compares this form of religious bigotry to the modern-day conquests of al-Qaeda. She states that, since much of the current land within the United States was taken by aggression and oppression, "Native peoples have vast claims to reparations and restitution," yet "[n]o monetary amount can compensate for lands illegally seized, particularly those sacred lands necessary for Indigenous peoples to regain social coherence."

She is featured in the feminist history film She's Beautiful When She's Angry.

She is Professor Emerita of Ethnic Studies at California State University, Hayward. Since retiring from university teaching, she has been lecturing widely and writing.

Awards 
The Lannan Foundation awarded Dunbar-Ortiz the 2017 Cultural Freedom Award, "for the achievements of her lifetime of tireless work."

Selected works
 Not "a Nation of Immigrants": Settler Colonialism, White Supremacy, and a History of Erasure and Exclusion. Beacon, 2021. 
 Loaded: A Disarming History of the Second Amendment. City Lights Books, 2018. , 
 "All the Real Indians Died Off” and 20 Other Myths about Native Americans. Beacon, 2016.
 An Indigenous Peoples' History of the United States. Beacon, 2014. , 
 The Great Sioux Nation: Sitting in Judgment on America. Random House, 1977, ; University of Nebraska Press, 2013. , 
 Roots of Resistance: Land Tenure in New Mexico, 1680–1980. University of California, 1980; new edition, University of Oklahoma Press, 2007. , 
 Red Dirt: Growing Up Okie. Verso, 1997; new edition, University of Oklahoma Press, 2006. , 
 Blood on the Border: Memoir of the Contra War. South End Press, 2005. , 
 Outlaw Woman: A Memoir of the War Years, 1960–75. City Light Books, 2002. , 
 The Miskito Indians of Nicaragua: Caught in the Crossfire. Minority Rights Group, 1988. , 
 Indigenous Peoples: A Global Quest for Justice. (ed.) A Report for the Independent Commission on International Humanitarian Issues, Geneva. Zed Press, 1987.
 La Cuestión Mískita en la Revolución Nicaragüense. Editorial Linea, 1986.
 Indians of the Americas: Human Rights and Self-Determination. Zed Press; Praeger, 1984. , 
 Native American Energy Resources and Development. (ed.) Albuquerque: Institute for Native American Development (INAD), University of New Mexico, 1980. , 
 Economic Development in American Indian Reservations. (ed.) INAD, University of New Mexico, 1979.

See also 
 Cell 16

References

External links 

 
 

20th-century American women writers
21st-century American women writers
20th-century American historians
21st-century American historians
Historians of the United States
Historians of Native Americans
Women's studies academics
American women historians
Feminist historians
American feminists
American women memoirists
20th-century American memoirists
Members of the American Indian Movement
American people who self-identify as being of Native American descent
California State University, East Bay faculty
American Book Award winners
Writers from Oklahoma
1938 births
Living people